Chavakachcheri railway station is a railway station in the town of Chavakachcheri in northern Sri Lanka. Owned by Sri Lanka Railways, the state-owned railway operator, the station is part of the Northern Line which links the north with the capital Colombo. The popular Yarl Devi service used to call at the station. The station has not been functioning since 1990 due to the civil war.

See also
 List of railway stations in Sri Lanka
 List of railway stations by line order in Sri Lanka

Railway stations on the Northern Line (Sri Lanka)
Buildings and structures in Chavakachcheri
Transport in Chavakachcheri
Chavakacheri